Odinga is a surname. Notable people with the surname include:

Jaramogi Oginga Odinga (1911–1994), Kenya's first vice-president and later opposition leader.
Raila Odinga (born 1945), Former Prime Minister of Kenya, son of Jaramogi Oginga Odinga
Ida Odinga (born 1950), Kenyan businesswoman, activist and educator, wife of Raila Odinga
Oburu Odinga (born 1943), MP, son of Jaramogi Oginga Odinga
Norman Odinga (born 1963), Canadian association football player
 Sekou Odinga, American activist from the Black Liberation Army

See also
Jaramogi Oginga Odinga University of Science and Technology in Kenya

Surnames of Kenyan origin